Lecheh Gurab (also Romanized as Lecheh Gūrāb, Lacheh Goorab, and Lacheh Gūrāb; also known as  Lajeh Gūrāb, Lūch Gūrāb, Luchurab, and Lūj Gurāb) is a village in Howmeh Rural District, in the Central District of Rasht County, Gilan Province, Iran. At the 2006 census, its population was 2,013, in 557 families.

References 

Populated places in Rasht County